Delta Air may refer to:

 Delta Air (Germany), German regional airline (1977–1992) 
 Delta Air Lines, a major American airline